Pakala Forest Park is a protected area in the Gambia covering . It was established in January 1954.

The national park is located at an altitude of 41 meters.

References

Protected areas established in 1954
Forest parks of the Gambia